Shikhanturi is a village in northern Georgia. It is located on the right bank of the river Patsa in the Java Municipality, Shida Kartli region. Distance to the municipal center Java is 7 km. The village is surrounded by Pine-beech and Beech-fir mixed forests.

References 

Mskhlebi Community villages